Reese Fernandez-Ruiz (born 1985) is a Filipino social entrepreneur and President and Founding Partner of Rags2Riches, a social enterprise established in 2007. The company aims to empower Philippine-based artisans, fashion and home products that follow environmental ethics principles, and alleviate poverty in Payatas, Quezon City.

Biography 
She was born Therese Clarence Arellano Chua Fernandez-Ruiz in the Philippines in 1985. She was raised by her mother, a missionary, who travelled and provided aid to the poor. Her mother’s work exposed Fernandez-Ruiz to the poverty and suffering of people in the Philippines.

Education 
Fernandez-Ruiz won a scholarship to attend Ateno de Manila University where she studied management.

Career 
Fernandez-Ruiz worked as a teacher upon graduating from college. She taught math, science, and reading skills in Payatas, a poverty stricken neighborhood in Quezon City, Philippines and home to one of the largest dump sites in the country.

Rags2Riches 
Fernandez-Ruiz founded Rags2Riches after seeing women in Payatas receive little profit for rugs they crafted from cloth and scrap foraged from the Quezon City dump site, due to middlemen controlling their supplies and rug sales. Fernandez-Ruiz tapped the help of fashion designer Rajo Laurel and social entrepreneur Xavier Alpasa. Rags2Riches created links with factories to provide the women with scrap materials and opportunity to sell their products directly to retailers without the middlemen. As a result, the women earn 40% of the products retail price. The company also provides women with education in personal finance, nutrition, and health insurance.The company has six store retail network in Manila and an online shop  and recycle over 800 tons of scrap material and have a production facility generating zero waste.

Awards 
In 2015, she was on  Forbes 30 Social Entrepreneurs Under 30, and she was named a Young Laureate for the Rolex Awards for Enterprise in 2010.

See also 

 Social entrepreneurship in South Asia

External links 

 Rags2Riches, Inc

References 

1985 births
Living people
Ateneo de Manila University alumni
Filipino company founders
Social entrepreneurs